William L. "Bobby" Robinson (October 25, 1903 - May 17, 2002) was an American Negro league baseball player.  He was known as the "Human Vacuum Cleaner" because of his fielding ability at third base.

Robinson started with the semi-pro Mobile Tigers with fellow Negro league players Satchel Paige and Ted Radcliffe.  He moved on to the Pensacola Giants where he was discovered by the Indianapolis ABC's in 1925.  He went on to play for the Birmingham Black Barons, the Chicago American Giants, the Memphis Red Sox, and the Detroit Stars over the next eight years.

Robinson retired from baseball in 1942. He died on May 17, 2002.

References

External links
 and Baseball-Reference Black Baseball stats and Seamheads
 William Robinson at Negro Leagues Baseball Museum

1903 births
2002 deaths
Birmingham Black Barons players
Detroit Stars players
Indianapolis ABCs players
Memphis Red Sox players
Indianapolis ABCs (1938) players
St. Louis Stars (1939) players
St. Louis–New Orleans Stars players
Nashville Elite Giants players
Sportspeople from Mobile, Alabama
Baseball players from Alabama
20th-century African-American sportspeople
21st-century African-American people